The Mirosławiec air accident occurred in Poland on 23 January 2008 when an EADS CASA C-295 military transport plane crashed as it approached the Mirosławiec runway, killing all passengers and crew. The Polish Air Force plane had been flying from Warsaw to the 12th Air Base in Mirosławiec, and the 20 victims included high-ranking Polish air force officers.

Although this was the first serious accident of a CASA C-295, after the accident all Polish C-295s were grounded until further notice. In the subsequent investigations the primary cause of the accident was determined to be an inadvertent loss of spatial and situational awareness by the aircraft crew during the landing approach in poor weather conditions, with a low cloud ceiling and little visibility.  A number of secondary causes and contributing factors were also found by the investigation after the accident, including deficiencies in the air traffic controllers' skills and methods of directing and controlling the landing. Military experts had qualified it as "the safest plane of the Polish air force".

The Polish defence minister Bogdan Klich dismissed five air force personnel after the accident investigation concluded that multiple failings contributed to the crash.

Among the fatalities was Brig. Gen. Andrzej Andrzejewski, commander of an air brigade based in Świdwin.

See also
 List of disasters in Poland by death toll
 2010 Polish Air Force Tu-154 crash

Notes

External links 
 

2008 in Poland
Aviation accidents and incidents caused by pilot error
Aviation accidents and incidents in 2008
Accidents and incidents involving the EADS CASA C-295
Aviation accidents and incidents in Poland
History of Poland (1989–present)
January 2008 events in Europe
2008 disasters in Poland